Alfred William Thomas Noble (18 September 1924 – 24 November 1999)  was an English footballer who represented Great Britain at the 1952 Summer Olympics. He made one appearance in the Football League for Colchester United, in December 1955.

References

1924 births
1999 deaths
English footballers
Footballers at the 1952 Summer Olympics
Olympic footballers of Great Britain
Briggs Sports F.C. players
Colchester United F.C. players
Leytonstone F.C. players
English Football League players
Footballers from the London Borough of Hackney
Association football forwards